The Royal Governor of Chile ruled over the Spanish colonial administrative district  called the Captaincy General of Chile, and as a result the Royal Governor also held the title of a Captain General. There were 66 such governors or captains during the Spanish conquest and the later periods of Spanish-centered colonialism. Since the first Spanish–Mapuche parliaments in the 17th century it became an almost mandatory tradition for each governor to arrange a parliament with the Mapuches.

List of governors

Governors and captains general of Chile

Appointed by Charles IV 
Ambrosio O'Higgins, Marquis of Osorno: (May 1788 – May 1796)
José de Rezabal y Ugarte (Interim): (May 1796 – September 1796)
Gabriel de Avilés, 2nd Marquis of Avilés: (18 September 1796 – 21 January 1799) 
Joaquín del Pino Sánchez de Rojas: (January 1799 – April 1801)
José de Santiago Concha Jiménez Lobatón (Interim): (April 1801 – December 1801)
Francisco Tadeo Diez de Medina Vidanges  (Interim): (December 1801 – January 1802)
Luis Muñoz de Guzmán: (January 1802 – February 1808)

Appointed by Ferdinand VII 
Juan Rodríguez Ballesteros (Interim): (February 1808 – April 1808)
Francisco Antonio García Carrasco Díaz: (April 1808 – July 1810)
(Dissolved 1810-1814 Patria Vieja)

Period of the Reconquista Española: Governors and Captains General:
 
Mariano Osorio (Interim): (2 October 1814 – 26 December 1815)
Francisco Marcó del Pont Ángel Díaz y Méndez: (26 December 1815 – 12 February 1817)

References

Sources 

 
Royal Governor
Chile
16th-century Chilean people
17th-century Chilean people
18th-century Chilean people
1540 establishments in the Spanish Empire
Chile history-related lists